Panagaeus relictus is a species of ground beetle in the Panagaeinae subfamily that can be found in Tajikistan, Turkmenistan, and Uzbekistan.

References

Beetles described in 1938
Beetles of Asia